The Nineveh Plain Forces or NPF was a military organization that was formed on 6 January 2015 by the indigenous Christian Assyrian people in Iraq, in cooperation with Peshmerga, to defend against Islamic State. The Nineveh Plains is a region at the heart of the Assyrian homeland. The militia is affiliated with the Bet-Nahrain Democratic Party and the Beth Nahrain Patriotic Union (HBA), the latter being part of the secular Dawronoye movement. It participated in the Battle of Mosul (2016–2017).

History
The Nineveh Plain Forces (NPF) was founded in January 2015 by the Bet Nahrain Democratic Party (BNDP), a small KDP-backed Assyrian political party. The Nineveh Plain Forces were registered within the Ministry of Peshmerga. At one time, the group claimed it had upwards of 600 soldiers. Yet some observers alleged that no more than 50 soldiers were active at any one time. When the Nineveh Plains was liberated, the NPF secured a small, mostly symbolic presence in Batnaya until the October 2017 withdrawal of KRG forces following the Kurdish referendum.

The NPF's stated goals were similar to those of the Nineveh Plain Protection Units; the key difference being that the NPF and the BNDP advocated for a Nineveh Plain Governorate administered by the KRG. BNDP leader Romeo Hakkari was a vocal proponent for Kurdish independence. But following the failed referendum the NPF was stripped of its security responsibilities. The last official update on its social media accounts is dated September 2, 2017. The force was disbanded soon after.

Battle of Mosul (2016–17) 

On 17 October 2016, the NPF announced their intentions to participate in the planned offensive in the Nineveh Plains alongside the Iraqi Army, Peshmerga and Iraqi Federal Police.

The Chaldean Syriac Assyrian political organizations held a meeting on 29 October 2016 to continue discussions from their previous meeting which was held on 21 October 2016. The meeting was hosted by Bishop Mar Yokhana Putrus Moshe with the presence of representative of Patriarch Mar Georgis Third Saliwa at the headquarters of the Syriac Catholic Diocese. During the meeting, they discussed ways to unite the efforts of the military and security coordination in the Nineveh Plain areas in order to enable the people of the region to management the security file. It was agreed that the military forces formations of our people are the fundamental forces to protect towns and villages in the Nineveh Plain. Seeking unity for the joint military efforts and coordination of security leaders by holding joint meetings between the stakeholders for this purpose.

NPF liberated the Assyrian village of Batnaya on Tuesday 25 October alongside Dwekh Nawsha and Peshmerga forces. The NPF placed the cross on the Chaldean Catholic Mar Oraha Monastery in Batnaya after ISIS removed all Christian religious symbols from the village.

A 2020 report by the Assyrian Policy Institute states that the NPF was disbanded in 2017 following the unsuccessful Kurdistan Region independence referendum.

See also 
 Dawronoye
 Bet-Nahrain Democratic Party
 Nineveh Plain Protection Units
 Qaraqosh Protection Committee
 Dwekh Nawsha
 List of armed groups in the War in Iraq (2013–2017)

References

External links 
 Official twitter account
 Official Facebook account

2015 establishments in Iraq
Anti-ISIL factions in Iraq
Assyrian organizations
War in Iraq (2013–2017)
Iraqi insurgency (2011–2013)
Military units and formations established in 2015
Military wings of nationalist parties
Paramilitary forces of Iraq
Dawronoye